{{DISPLAYTITLE:C4H5NS}}
The molecular formula C4H5NS (molar mass: 99.15 g/mol, exact mass: 99.0143 u) may refer to:

 Allyl isothiocyanate (AITC)
 Thiazine

Molecular formulas